Bačišta is a village in the municipality of Kičevo, North Macedonia. It used to be part of the former Zajas Municipality. The village has an Albanian school and a mosque.

History 
The village population consists of a traditionally Albanien Muslim  speaking population that is surrounded by Muslim Albanian villages.   population is Albanian. Common language and origin with Macedonian Christians does not play a role for a majority of Macedonian Muslims regarding self-identification which is based on common religion (Islam).   In the 1990s parents from Bačišta refused to send their children to the local village Macedonian language school and the introduction of Albanian schooling was attempted. Inhabitants of Bačišta have claimed to be Macedonianized Albanians. Blame on the linguistic and identity shift in the 1990s regarding Bačišta has been placed on the Albanian political party, the PDP and its Kičevo branch however the village has been neglected economically and developmentally over time. In 1992 Albanian schooling until the 8th grade was introduced in Bačišta.

Demographics
In statistics gathered by Vasil Kanchov in 1900, the village of Bačišta was inhabited by 450 Muslim Bulgarians. The Yugoslav census of 1953 recorded 501 people of whom 407 were Albanians, 26 Macedonians, 1 Turks and 7 others. The 1961 Yugoslav census recorded 527 people of whom 514 were Albanians, 4 Turks, 2 Macedonians and 7 others. The 1971 census recorded 642 people of whom 612 were Albanians, 20 Turks, 2 Macedonian and 8 others. The 1981 Yugoslav census recorded 646 people of whom 581 were Albanians, 34 Macedonians, 3 Turks, 13 Bosniaks and 15 others. The Macedonian census of 1994 recorded 685 people of whom 684 were Albanians and 1 other.

As of the 2021 census, Bačišta had 470 residents with the following ethnic composition:
Albanians 443
Persons for whom data are taken from administrative sources 25
Roma 2

According to the 2002 census, the village had a total of 772 inhabitants. Ethnic groups in the village include:
Albanians 756
Macedonians 1
Others 15

See also 
Macedonian Muslims

References

External links

Villages in Kičevo Municipality
Macedonian Muslim villages
Albanian communities in North Macedonia